Phool Khile Hain Gulshan Gulshan is a 1978 Indian Hindi-language film produced by Surinder Kapoor and directed by Sikandar Khanna. The film stars Ashok Kumar, Rishi Kapoor, Moushumi Chatterjee, Mithun Chakraborty, Asrani, Paintal, Ranjeet, Amjad Khan and Helen. The soundtrack is directed by Laxmikant-Pyarelal.

Cast
Ashok Kumar as Lala Ganpat Rai
Rishi Kapoor as Vishal Rai
Moushumi Chatterjee as Shanti
Mithun Chakraborty as Vishal's Friend
Asrani as Vishal's Friend
Paintal as Vishal's Friend
Ranjeet as Bhiku Prasad
Amjad Khan as Kalandar
Helen

Crew
Director : Sikandar Khanna
Producer : Surinder Kapoor
Story : Kaushal Bharti
Dialogue : Rajendra Krishan
Cinematographer : D. S. Pathak, Sharad Kadve
Editor : Kamlakar

Soundtrack
All songs were penned by Rajendra Krishan

External links 
 

1978 films
1970s Hindi-language films
Films scored by Laxmikant–Pyarelal